The World Group was the highest level of Fed Cup women's tennis competition in 2005. Eight nations competed in a three-round knockout competition. Russia was the defending champion, and they reached the final alongside, for a second consecutive time, France. Russia defeated France once again, giving them their second title.

Participating Teams

Draw

First round

Russia vs. Italy

Belgium vs. United States

Spain vs. Argentina

Austria vs. France

Semifinals

Russia vs. United States

Spain vs. France

Final

Russia vs. France

References

See also
Fed Cup structure

World Group
Fed Cup World Group